Extremity is a 2018 American horror film directed by Anthony DiBlasi, starring Chad Rook, Dana Christina and J. Larose.

Cast
 Chad Rook as Bob/Red Skull
 Chantal Perron as Dr. Silvia Nichols
 Dana Christina as Allison Belle
 Dylan Sloane as Zachary
 Ashley Smith as Nell Leycock/White Skull
 Yoshihiro Nishimura as Cameraman
 Ami Tomite as Konishi
 J. Larose as Phil

Release
The film was received a limited theatrical release and was released on VOD and Blu-ray on 2 October 2018.

Reception
Rich Cross of Starburst rated the film 8 stars out of 10, writing that "in contrast to so much derivative “maniac-with-a-machete” indie-horror output, Extremity displays a determination to do things differently and an assuredness and confidence that sets it apart." Shawn Macomber of Rue Morgue wrote a positive review of the film, writing that "The world that director Anthony DiBlasi summons is rich, realistic and frightening. Christina delivers an affecting and nuanced performance, working with heavy material that could’ve gone poorly in lesser hands. The haunters are all legit embodiments of menace and intimidation." 

Sean Leonard of HorrorNews.net wrote a positive review of the film, writing that the film "is able to approach the audience on multiple levels, engaging them in a film that can still be enjoyable on multiple viewings." Tiffany Blem of PopHorror wrote a positive review of the film, writing, "While at times the film becomes muddy and boring – after some of the masks are removed, thus humanizing the predators – it is still effective in that it made me wonder if I could ever subject myself to something of this magnitude."

Ian Sedensky of Culture Crypt gave the film a score of 30 out of 100, writing that it "amounts to directionless “smut dressed up as entertainment”."

References

External links
 
 

American horror films
2018 horror films